Kadee Quality Products Co. is a model railroad manufacturer.

Kadee may also refer to:

KaDee Strickland (born 1975), American actress
Kadee Leishman, actress, artist and professional ice skater